Angelo Alberto Giani (11 August 1955 - 2006) was an Italian sport shooter who won a medal at individual senior level at the World Championships and European Championships.

References

External links
 

1955 births
2006 deaths
Trap and double trap shooters
Italian male sport shooters
20th-century Italian people